T. M. Selvaganapathy is an Indian politician. He was a member of Tamil Nadu Legislative Assembly, elected from Tiruchengode constituency in 1991. He was also minister of Local Administration in Jayalalitha Government between 1991 and 1996. In 1999-2004 he was elected as Member of Parliament to the 13th Lok Sabha from Salem Constituency. Originally a member of Anna Dravida Munnetra Kazhagam party, he joined Dravida Munnetra Kazhagam in August 2008. He was convicted by a trial court in Colour TV scam on 30 May 2000 and was later acquitted by the High court on 4 December 2001.

In June 2010, he became a member of the Rajya Sabha. In 2014, he was convicted by a court for a financial scam, resulting in his disqualification. He became the first Tamil Nadu politician to be disqualified from the parliament for corruption.

References 

All India Anna Dravida Munnetra Kazhagam politicians
Living people
Lok Sabha members from Tamil Nadu
India MPs 1999–2004
Rajya Sabha members from Tamil Nadu
Indian politicians convicted of crimes
Indian politicians disqualified from office
People from Salem district
Year of birth missing (living people)
Tamil Nadu MLAs 1991–1996
Dravida Munnetra Kazhagam politicians
Indian politicians convicted of corruption